USS Fli-Hawk (SP-550) was a United States Navy patrol vessel in commission from 1917 to 1919.

Fli-Hawk was built as a private motorboat or motor yacht of the same name in 1912. In 1917, the U.S. Navy acquired her under a free lease from her owner for use as a section patrol vessel during World War I. She was commissioned as USS Fli-Hawk (SP-550) on 12 May 1917.

Assigned to the 5th Naval District, Fli-Hawk operated on patrol duties in the Norfolk, Virginia, area for the rest of World War I.

On 31 December 1917, Fli-Hawk was getting underway when she collided with the steamer SS Gratitude in Norfolk Harbor. Fli-Hawk sank three hours later, but was raised, repaired, and returned to service.

Fli-Hawk was decommissioned on 8 February 1919 and returned to her owner.

Notes

References

SP-550 Fli-Hawk at Department of the Navy Naval History and Heritage Command Online Library of Selected Images: U.S. Navy Ships -- Listed by Hull Number "SP" #s and "ID" #s -- World War I Era Patrol Vessels and other Acquired Ships and Craft numbered from SP-500 through SP-599
NavSource Online: Section Patrol Craft Photo Archive: Fli-Hawk (SP 550)

Patrol vessels of the United States Navy
World War I patrol vessels of the United States
1912 ships
Individual yachts
Maritime incidents in 1917
Ships sunk in collisions
Shipwrecks of the Virginia coast